The Synagogue of El Tránsito, also known as the Synagogue of Samuel ha-Levi or Halevi, is a historic synagogue, church, and Sephardic museum in Toledo, Spain. Designed by master mason Don Meir (Mayr) Abdeil, it was built as an annex of the palace of Samuel ha-Levi Abulafia, treasurer to King Peter of Castile, in 1357.

The synagogue was converted into a church after the expulsion of the Jews from Spain in 1492. It was briefly used as military barracks during the Napoleonic Wars of the early 1800s. It became a museum in 1910, formally known today as the Sephardic Museum. Besides being a historic building, it's also known for its rich stucco decoration, Mudéjar style, and women's gallery.

History of building

Synagogue 
The synagogue was built around 1357, under the patronage of Samuel HaLevi Abulafia. His family had served the Castilian kings for several generations and included kabbalists and Torah scholars such as Meir and Todros Abulafia. Another of the same name, Todros Abulafia, was one of the last poets to write in the Arab-influenced style favored by Jewish poets in twelfth and thirteenth-century Spain.

Located within Toledo's medieval Jewish quarter, the synagogue is connected to Samuel haLevi Abulafia's house by a gate and was intended as a private house of worship. It also served as a center for Jewish religious education or yeshiva.

Some scholars suggest that Peter of Castile assented to the construction of the synagogue as a token of appreciation for haLevi Abulafia’s service as counselor and treasurer to the king. Peter may also have allowed it to compensate the Jews of Toledo for the persecution of Jews during the Black Death in 1348.

Throughout the 14th century, Spanish Regional Councils had sparked a prohibition on the construction of Jewish synagogues. As to why the construction of this synagogue would have been allowed remains debated, but scholars reason that it was due to Samuel halevi's relationship with the King Peter of Castile, or the fact that it was a private home. It may also be that limitations did not apply in Castile to synagogues built in private houses, which was a common way to pass the ban on creating new synagogues in both Christian and Muslim areas. Often times construction would be allowed after payment of a fee or bribe. More recent evidence also suggest that the synagogue was built over an older synagogue, thus forming a loophole in the ban since this was perhaps was not viewed as a new construction.

Samuel haLevi eventually fell out of favor with the king . He was arrested in December 1360 on corruption charges, imprisoned in Seville, and tortured to death.

In 1391, during a wave of anti-Jewish killings, the Jewish quarter of Toledo was attacked, but the synagogue was saved.

Church 
After the expulsion of Jews from Spain in 1492, the synagogue was converted to a church. It was given to the Order of Calatrava by King Ferdinand and Queen Isabella of Spain. The Order is said to have converted the building into a church serving a priory dedicated to Saint Benedict. It was from its time as a church that the building acquired the name “El Tránsito,” which refers to the Assumption of the Virgin Mary. In the 17th century the church's name changed to Nuestra Señora del Tránsito: the name derives from a painting by Juan Correa de Vivar housed there which depicted the Transit of the Virgin.

Military barracks 
The synagogue was used as military headquarters during the Napoleonic Wars.

National monument and museum 
In 1877 the building became a national monument. The transformation of the building into the Sephardi Museum, as it is now called, started around 1910. It was initiated by the Vega-Inclan Foundation.  In 1964, a royal decree established the Museo Sefardi, located in the Synagogue of Samuel ha-Levi. Four years later, in 1968, it was renamed the National Museum for Hispanic-Hebraic Art. The building, which is in a good state of conservation, remains a museum.

Restorations 
Subsequent to its conversion to a Catholic church and its use as military barracks, the building underwent several periods of restoration. The first phase began in 1879 with the cleaning and repair of the hechal (Torah ark), the restoration of at least fourteen lattices, and the removal of various Hebrew inscriptions. In 1884, Arturo Mélida y Alinari replaced Francisco Isidori as the head architect of the project, focusing mainly on the roof, façade, and reinforcements. The building fell back into disrepair before it became part of the Casa Museo del Greco in 1911, when a new large-scale phase of restorations began. Scaffolding that had been put up in previous decades was removed, along with partitions from the women's gallery. The wooden church choir and portions of the interior were restored. The addition of a library to the lower part of the gallery, which has since become an important center for Hebrew studies, entailed the demolition of large portions of the façade.

Architecture 

With the apparent approval of the king, ha-Levi defied the laws that required synagogues to be smaller and lower than churches and plain when it came to decoration. The prayer hall is rectangular and measures 23 × 9.5 meters (roughly 75.5 feet × 29.5 feet) and has a 12-meter-high ceiling (close to 40 feet) and features Nasrid-style polychrome stucco-work, multi-foil arches, and a massive Mudéjar artesonado ceiling. Hebrew inscriptions praising the king and ha-Levi himself, Arabic inscriptions, and quotations from the Psalms can also be seen. There were also Christian elements in the architecture that mixed muqarnas ornament with heraldry and vegetal motifs that were common in Christian and Islamic buildings as well as in  synagogues of the time. The ornamentation also bears the ha-Levi coat of arms, a borrowing of Christian architectural customs. Arabic inscriptions surround the prayer room and are intertwined with the floral patterns in the stucco. They are in Kufic-style script and include positive devotional affirmations and praises of God common in Islamic architecture. All along the prayer hall are large larchwood frames made with inlaid carved polychrome of ivory. The original floor which only some parts have been preserved were covered in mosaics. It is illuminated by a multitude of windows.

Women were separated from men during services; a second-floor gallery was reserved for them. The gallery is located along the southern wall, having five broad openings looking down towards the ark of the Torah (called in the Sephardic tradition the hechal, hejal, heichal or heikal). The hechal developed a design innovation in the form of a great façade that had three vertical panels with a sebka motif in the center panel, as well as muqarnas cornices with vegetal and garden motifs.

The architecture of El Tránsito influenced other 14th century synagogues, like the Cordoba Synagogue, which shared the three-panel façade hechal design and the Mudéjar architecture.

In contrast with the highly ornamented interior, the exterior of the synagogue was built of brick and stone and was plain and largely unadorned. The mixed stone and brick exterior walls are simple, with an aljima window (a pair of horseshoe arches) over the entry door. This left the synagogue an unassuming building that did not stand out from its surroundings, except in that its tall roof elevated it slightly above the adjacent buildings.

The eastern wall received the most extensive ornamentation. It is divided into six pieces and is made of cedar wood. Its top half is decorated with septfoil arches, while the centre piece is patterned with arabesques.  It is thought that Samuel Ha-Levi imported the wood from Lebanon to imitate King Salomon.

Mudéjar 
El Tránsito synagogue is a significant example of medieval Spain's mudéjar, or Islamic-inspired, style of art and architecture. Its façade was and remains a prime example of mudéjar architecture in Al-Andalus which symbolizes the social status, power, and influence of Samuel Ha-Levi. Ha-Levi often interacted with the Nasrid dynasty's court in Granada at the palace of the Alhambra and very likely spoke Arabic. Because of this, it is believed he was inspired by the architecture and emulated it for the synagogue.

Around the same time as the construction of the synagogue and the Alhambra by Muhammad V, Peter of Castile restored the Alcazar of Sevilla, a historic Almohad fortification with Nasrid architectural and mudéjar design elements.  Muhammad V and Peter of Castile were allies on occasion. They are thought to have shared their architects and artisans to build the most opulent and luxurious palaces. As the king's treasurer, ha-Levi traveled between Seville, Granada, and Toledo while the synagogue was in construction. He also negotiated with the king's contractors and architects over construction expenses. As a result, he must have benefited from the same architects, masons, and design and architectural ideas.

Islam architecture and aesthetic mixed with the Castilian coat of arms are significant in that it indicates a connivance from Ha-Levi towards the dominating religions.  The fact that Samuel was entrusted with the use of the Castile seal indicates his power and reliability with Peter of Castile and his reign.

Hebrew and Arabic Inscriptions 
The Arabic inscriptions in the Synagogue are decorative, though legible, and are not affiliated with the Quran. They are placed away from the Eastern wall (the Synagogue's focal point) and higher up, they were also meant as a good sign of interfaith. For example one of these reads: Bi'l ni'mah wa-bi'l quwah wa bo'l karamah, roughly translated, "by (or in) grace, power, magnanimity (or, alternatively, generosity or happiness), salvation".

The Hebrew inscriptions, however, draw from Psalms. It mentions Ariel, a reference to Jerusalem. The Hebrew inscriptions surrounding the coat of arms, reads as follows in English:

Also on the Eastern wall, above the blind arches, is a foundational plaque dedicated to Samuel HaLevi.  Due to its deteriorating state, the exact date is not clear; however, scholars are able to determine the year by using Hebrew words that double as numbers in the language.  In the plaque, the Hebrew letters טוב ליהודים that when added together amount to 5122 using the Hebrew calendar, the equivalent to 1357 in the Gregorian calendar.

Below the Coat of arms of Castile and León lies yet another Hebrew inscription, expressing admiration for the beauty of the synagogue. It references Bezalel and the biblical story in which he is chosen to build the Tabernacle, creating an allusion to haLevi himself:

In the prayer room, on top of the four walls the ceiling, just below the ceiling we find the following inscription:

"See the sanctuary now consecrated in Israel

And the house which was built by Samuel with a pulpit of wood for reading the law

With its scrolls and its crowns all for God

And its lavers and lamps to illuminate

And its windows like the windows of Ariel" Some experts believe the inscriptions also refer to another renowned Samuel, a Levite named Samuel ibn Naghrela (993-1056), a significant Jewish leader throughout the Middle Ages, both Samuels were proud of their Levitic ancestry.

Motifs 

The starry sky that decorates the frieze of the synagogue represents the idea of heaven. While the floor, which contains vegetal patterns, signifies the Earth. This is important, as it represents the separation of heaven and Earth, and its relation to Jerusalem. According to Jewish belief, Jerusalem, being situated on the highest place on the planet, serves as a sort of in-between for heaven and Earth, and is, by consequence, the place closest to heaven. In the synagogue, there is a stucco carving within the clerestory, as well as towards the bottom of the wall a representation of Jerusalem. This symbolic reference to Jerusalem comes from the story of Genesis. The symbolic placement stucco mixed with the inscriptions (discussed above) is reminiscent of the Alhambra, since Ha-Levi's intention was that the spectator could read the architecture and art like a book—as is seen in Islamic alcázar and mosques in Al-Andalus.

References

External links
  Official Website
https://www.museodelprado.es/en/the-collection/art-work/the-death-of-the-virgin/54ac6ccc-5624-421c-9c48-bb4827dc0a8c

Jews and Judaism in Toledo, Spain
Transito
Buildings and structures in Toledo, Spain
1356 establishments in Europe
Religious organizations established in the 1350s
Museums in Toledo, Spain
14th-century synagogues
Synagogues preserved as museums
Conversion of non-Christian religious buildings and structures into churches
Tourist attractions in Toledo, Spain
Religious museums in Spain
14th-century establishments in Spain
Sephardi synagogues
Mudéjar architecture in Castilla–La Mancha